Amun (Amun-Ra, Amon, Ammon, Amen, Amoun, or Hammon) is an Egyptian god.

Amun may also refer to:

People
 Saint Amun, 4th-century Christian ascetic and founder of a monastic community in Egypt
 Amun Abdullahi (born 1974), Somali-Swedish journalist and founder of a girls' school in Mogadishu, Somalia
 Amun Starr (born 1984), American musical artist
 Fanny Amun (born 1962), Nigerian football player

Fictional characters
 Amun (comics), a Marvel Comics character
 Amun, a character in the film series The Twilight Saga

Other uses
 Amun-Re (board game), a 2003 board game
 3554 Amun, a near-Earth asteroid
 Rasm Amun, a village in Syria
 Temple of Amun, Jebel Barkal, an archeological site in Sudan

See also
 
 Amon (disambiguation)
 Ammon (disambiguation)
 Amoun, another name of the ascetic Ammonas
 Aman (disambiguation)